Zignago (locally ) is a comune (municipality) in the Province of La Spezia in the Italian region Liguria, located about  east of Genoa and about  north of La Spezia.

Zignago borders the following municipalities: Brugnato, Rocchetta di Vara, Sesta Godano, Zeri.

References

Cities and towns in Liguria